RPCA may refer to:
Reformed Presbyterian Church of Australia
Robust principal component analysis
Research, Protection, Containment Authority